Baiqi may refer to:

Places 
Baiqi, town in Shulan, Jilin, China
Baiqi, town in Fengcheng, Liaoning, China
Baiqi, township in Chongli District, Zhangjiakou, Hebei, China
Baiqi Hui Ethnic Township, Hui'an County, Fujian, China

People 
Bai Qi (died 257 BC), military general of Qin state during the Warring States period of China